Spiked (also written as sp!ked) is a British Internet magazine focusing on politics, culture and society. The magazine was founded in 2001 with the same editor and many of the same contributors as Living Marxism, which had closed in 2000 after losing a case for libel brought by ITN. 

There is general agreement that Spiked is libertarian, with the majority of specialist academic sources identifying it as right-libertarian, and some non-specialist sources identifying it as left-libertarian. Activists associated with Spiked, sometimes described as part of "the Spiked network", took part in the Brexit Party as candidates or publicists, while disagreeing with Nigel Farage on many domestic issues.

Editors and contributors
Spiked is edited by Tom Slater, who was previously its deputy editor. He was appointed in September 2021, and replaced Brendan O'Neill, who had been editor following Mick Hume's departure in January 2007. On ceasing to be editor, O'Neill became Spiked'''s 'inaugural chief political writer'.

The magazine also produces a number of podcasts, with contributors including Christopher Snowdon.

OriginSpiked emerged from Living Marxism, the magazine of the Revolutionary Communist Party (RCP). Living Marxism was founded in 1988 and rebranded as LM in 1999.Spiked was founded in 2000 after the bankruptcy of its predecessor after losing a libel case brought against it by the broadcasting corporation ITN. The case centered around ITN coverage of Fikret Alić and other Bosnian Muslims standing behind a barbed-wire fence at the Trnopolje camp during the Bosnian war. LM claimed to oppose Western intervention on traditional anti-imperialist grounds, and published an article titled "The Picture that Fooled the World" which claimed that ITN's coverage was deceptive, the barbed-wire did not enclose the camp and the Muslims were in fact "refugees, many of whom went there seeking safety and could leave again if they wished." During the court case, evidence given by the camp doctor led LM to abandon its defence. ITN was awarded damages and costs, estimated to be around £1 million.

The RCP itself formally dissolved in 1996, but maintained its existence as a loose network, first around LM and then Spiked. The group of writers associated with LM who went on to form the core editorial group at Spiked, are often referred to as the "LM network" or "Spiked network".

Content

Frank Furedi, interviewed in Spiked in 2007, said that the stance of LM and Spiked originates from the "anti-Stalinist left". Environmentalists such as George Monbiot and Peter Melchett have suggested that the LM Network pursued an ideologically motivated 'anti-environmentalist' agenda under the guise of promoting humanism.Profiles: Martin Durkin, LobbyWatch. Retrieved 17 April 2007. In a 2007 interview in Spiked, Frank Furedi referred to these critics as "a network of McCarthyites". Monbiot described the views of Living Marxism as having, "less in common with the left than with the fanatical right." In 2018, Monbiot wrote that, "Its [Spiked's] articles repeatedly defend figures on the hard right or far right: Katie Hopkins, Nigel Farage, Alex Jones, the Democratic Football Lads' Alliance, Tommy Robinson, Toby Young, Arron Banks, Viktor Orbán".The Daily Beast, as well as Paul Mason of the New Statesman, have described the site as libertarian. A study in Policy & Internet by Heft et al. described Spiked as populist, saying that it has "roots in the radical left‐wing scene, but now oppose the political establishment from a position on the right side of the spectrum." According to Tim Knowles, the technology correspondent for  The Times, Spiked is right-wing and libertarian, while Evan Smith, a historian who has written on Spiked in the context of its free speech campaigns, has noted its "right-libertarian and iconoclastic style". By contrast, digital media scholar Jean Burgess and James Bowman of the conservative Ethics and Public Policy Center have referred to the site as left-libertarian.Spiked opposes many public health interventions. For example, it sees campaigns against obesity as state intrusion and “a war on the poor”. It opposes multiculturalism and (as its contributor Munira Mirza put it) sees institutional racism as “a perception more than a reality”.Spiked opposed the post-9/11 invasions of Afghanistan and of Iraq and Western interference in developing nations in general.Spiked saw the UK's vote to leave the European Union as a demonstration of democracy against ruling elites and has celebrated Nigel Farage's Brexit Party and Boris Johnson's Conservative government for their stance on this. Activists associated with Spiked, sometimes described as part of 'the Spiked network', were active in campaigning for the UK to leave the EU, with a number of its activists involved in the Brexit Party as candidates or publicists. Among those associated with Spiked who joined the Brexit Party were Claire Fox, who said she largely disagreed with Farage on domestic policies, and sought to build a left-wing faction inside the party.

In 2018 Monbiot wrote that "Spiked's writers rage against exposures of dark money. It calls The Observers Carole Cadwalladr, who has won a string of prizes for exposing the opaque spending surrounding the Brexit vote, 'the closest thing the mainstream British media has to an out-and-out conspiracy theorist'".Spiked opposed lockdown as a policy during the Covid-19 pandemic.

In July 2020, an exposé by The Daily Beast reported that Spiked was one of several mainly conservative websites that had inadvertently published articles attributed to non-existent experts on the Middle East. This network of fake journalists promoted the United Arab Emirates and pushed for harsher treatment of that country's opponents. Spiked did not remove the two articles, instead leaving an editorial note mentioning the articles' questionable authorship.

Following the start of the 2022 Russian invasion of Ukraine, Spiked took a strong pro-Ukrainian position, often publishing articles praising the Ukrainian people and attacking Russian President Vladimir Putin. However, it also criticized Western media reaction following the 2022 missile explosion in Poland, accusing such media of not taking the risk of a major escalation with Russia seriously enough.

Projects

In May 2007 Spiked launched the Spiked Review of Books as a monthly online literary criticism feature. This coincided with controversy in the United States following the scaling back of newspaper book review sections. 

Spiked produces annual "free speech rankings" of UK universities.

Funding
A joint investigation between DeSmog UK and The Guardian revealed that Spiked US Inc. received funding from the Charles Koch Foundation between 2016 and 2018 to develop live campus events connected with The Toleration and Free Speech program sponsored by the Charles Koch Foundation. The Guardian suggested that this was due to the online magazine's attacks on left-wing politics, its support and defence of hard right and far-right figures, and the many articles it publishes by writers supported by the Institute of Economic Affairs and the Koch-funded Cato Institute. Spiked'''s editor Brendan O'Neil dismissed such accusations as "McCarthyism" and stated that such funding was used to promote debate about free speech, noting that the Toleration and Free Speech Programme at the Charles Koch Foundation supports projects from both progressive and conservative groups, such as the American Civil Liberties Union, the Foundation for Individual Rights in Education, the National Coalition Against Censorship, the Newseum, the Knight Foundation and the American Society of News Editors.

References

External links

2000 establishments in the United Kingdom
Online magazines published in the United Kingdom
Political magazines published in the United Kingdom
Climate change denial
Freedom of speech in the United Kingdom
Libertarianism in the United Kingdom
Magazines established in 2000
Organizations of environmentalism skeptics and critics
Politics and technology
Revolutionary Communist Party (UK, 1978)